Tietäjien lahja (The Gift of the Magi) is a 1994 Christmas chamber opera by Einojuhani Rautavaara. The libretto is based on The Gift of the Magi by American author O. Henry which Rautavaara had first encountered in New York in 1955. However the story was changed from 1900 New York to the composer's own childhood in Helsinki's Kallio district in the 1930s.

Recordings
Rautavaara: The Gift of the Magi (sung in Finnish) Pia Freund, Jaakko Kortekangas Veräjäpelto Choir, Tapiola Sinfonietta, Petri Sakari 2CD Ondine

References

Operas
1994 operas
Finnish-language operas
Operas set in the 20th century
Operas by Einojuhani Rautavaara
Operas set in Finland